This is a list of railway stations in the Dutch province Drenthe:

Current stations 
 Assen railway station
 Beilen railway station
 Coevorden railway station
 Dalen railway station
 Emmen railway station
 Emmen Zuid railway station
 Hoogeveen railway station
 Meppel railway station
 Nieuw Amsterdam railway station

Closed stations 

 Anderen railway station
 Buinen railway station
 Dalerveen railway station
 Drouwen railway station
 Echten railway station
 Eext railway station
 Emmen Bargeres railway station
 Exloo railway station
 Gasselte railway station
 Gasselternijveen railway station
 Gieten railway station
 Hooghalen railway station
 Koekange railway station
 Musselkanaal Valthermond railway station
 Nijeveen railway station
 Oranjekanaal railway station
 Oudemolen railway station
 Ruinerwold railway station
 Rolde railway station
 Tweede Dwarsdiep railway station
 Vries-Zuidlaren railway station
 Valthe railway station
 Wijster railway station
 Weerdinge railway station
 Zandberg railway station
 Zuidbarge railway station

See also
 Railway stations in the Netherlands

 
Dre